Nikolaos Kaltsas (born in Dialambi, Rhodope) is a Greek classical archaeologist.

Kaltsas studied classical archaeology at the University of Thessaloniki, where he received his doctorate in 1985. Having already served as curator at the Archaeological Museum of Olympia (1981-1983), he became curator of the sculptural collection at the National Archaeological Museum of Athens and from 2002 to 2012 was director of the museum. He is a corresponding member of the German Archaeological Institute.

Selected publications
 Olympia, Archaeological Receipts Fund, Athens 1997.
 Τα γλυπτά. Εθνικό Αρχαιολογικό Μουσείο, κατάλογος, Kapon, Athen 2001, .
 Translated as: Sculpture in the National Archaeological Museum, Athens, The J. Paul Getty Museum, Los Angeles 2002 .
 "Die Kore und der Kouros aus Myrrhinous." Antike Plastik 28, Hirmer, München 2002, pp. 7–39.
 The National Archeological Museum, National Archaeological Museum, Athen 2007. Online
 with Alan Shapiro. Worshiping Women. Ritual and Reality in Classical Athens, Onassis Foundation, New York 2008.
 with Alan Shapiro: The Feminine and the Sacred in Ancient Athens, Onassis Foundation,New York 2010.

External links 
 Portrait in Ta Nea from 2 April 2010 (Greek)
 Biography on the website of the International Institute for Restoration and Preservation Studies

Classical archaeologists
German Archaeological Institute
National Archaeological Museum, Athens
Aristotle University of Thessaloniki alumni
Greek archaeologists
People from Rhodope (regional unit)